Ko Channabasappa (KoChe) was Kannada writer, lawyer and freedom fighter participated in the Quit India movement.

Early life 
KoChe was born in Alur in the Kudligi taluk of Ballari district of Karnataka.

Work 
KoChe is best known for his works that include Sri Ramayana Darshanam Mahakavya Samikshe, Khajane, Raktaparna, Hindurugi Baralilla, Nyayalayada Satyakathe, Hrudaya Naivedya and Belakinadege. He presided over the Kannada Sahitya Sammelana at Vijayapura in 2015.

Books 
 Prabuddha Nagarikatva Mattu Namma Manava Kendrita Rashtra
 Kavi Vibhuthige Namo
 Jagajjanani Bharata
 Koche Samagra Katha Kosha
 S Nijalingappa

References 

Kannada-language writers
Indian writers
2019 deaths
People from Bellary district